Gökhan Ünal (born 23 July 1982) is a Turkish football manager and former player. He is the manager of the Turkish club Altınordu.

During a professional career that lasted nearly 20 years, he played for 13 clubs, most notably Kayserispor for whom he was the top scorer with during the 2005–06 Süper Lig season.

Career
He joined Kayserispor in 2003 and became the top goal scorer in the Süper Lig scoring 25 goals in the 2005–06 season. His goal scoring ability was also apparent in European competitions, where he scored 6 goals in 8 games during Kayserispor's UEFA Intertoto Cup campaign in the same season, in which they became the first team from Turkey to win the competition.

He attracted attention from a number of top clubs, namely Galatasaray who tried to sign him during the summer break in 2007, but Kayserispor refused all offers, as well as another from Russian team FC Rubin Kazan for €6 million. He transferred to Trabzonspor on June 3, 2008 for a club record €6.25 million.

Fenerbahçe
On 18 January 2010 Fenerbahçe signed the forward from Trabzonspor until June 2013 for €3.5 million plus midfielder Burak Yılmaz, who was on loan at Eskisehirspor until now. Ünal scored his first goal for Fenerbahçe on February 14 against Manisaspor when he scored the equalizing goal in the 97th minute.

Ünal was sent to İstanbul Büyükşehir Belediyesi S.K. on a 6-month loan after his poor start to the season.

Return to Kayserispor
Ünal was transferred back to his old club Kayserispor on a loan deal for the 2011–12 season.

Career statistics

Club

International career
His current record for the Turkey national team is also impressive, with a goal in his only start so far. He also scored the national team's 550th goal against on 24 March 2007, scoring the second goal in a 4–1 victory over Greece in Athens. And scored his second goal against on 12 September 2007 Turkey-Hungary.

International goals

*Turkey results/scores listed first

Honors
Gençlerbirliği
 Turkish Cup: 2000–01

Kayserispor
 Turkish Cup: 2007–08
 UEFA Intertoto Cup: 2006

Individual
Süper Lig top scorer: 2005–06

References

External links
 
 
 "Gökhan Ünal kimdir?" – ForumFootball.com
 
 

1982 births
Ankaraspor footballers
Kayserispor footballers
Gençlerbirliği S.K. footballers
Trabzonspor footballers
Fenerbahçe S.K. footballers
Balıkesirspor footballers
Living people
Turkish footballers
Turkey international footballers
Turkey B international footballers
Süper Lig players
Footballers from Ankara
TFF First League players
Association football forwards